Lilly de Jongh Osborne (November 9, 1883 – March 14, 1975) was a Costa Rican writer, lecturer, collector, and scholar specializing in Mesoamerican arts, crafts, and textiles. She published several works in this field. Some of her many artifacts are part of the collections at the University of Pennsylvania Museum of Archaeology and Anthropology

Biography
Born in San José, Costa Rica, Osborne was the daughter of Dutch parents, Juan J. and Jenny G. de Jongh. She graduated from the Colegio de Senoritas (San Jose, 1900). She had been a member of various organizations including the Academia de Geografía e Historia de Guatemala, El Ateneo de El Salvado, Society of Woman Geographers, and Real Academia de Bellas Artes de San Fernando. The Guatemalan textiles which she collected in the mid to late 1930s are housed at the
University of Pennsylvania Museum of Archaeology and Anthropology. She has published extensively in this field.

She married Edmund Arthur Osborne (1873–1941). There were three children, Stanley, Leslie, and Elsa. Osborne died in Guatemala City, Guatemala 1975.

Selected works
 Minor Native arts in Central America
 Indian crafts of Guatemala
 1928, Brief von Lilly de Jongh Osborne an Max Uhle
 1933, Making a textile collection (with Pan American Union)
 1935, Tupui or coral serpent, black spots on Indian children
 1935, Guatemala textiles
 1956, Four keys to El Salvador
 1960, Así es Guatemala
 1963, Breves apuntes de la indumentar a idigena de Guatemala
 1965,  Folklore, supersticiones y leyendas de Guatemala (with Sociedad de Geografía e Historia de Guatemala; Comisión Permanente de Folklore, Etnografía y Etnología)
 1965,  Indian crafts of Guatemala and El Salvador (with Jay I. Kislak Reference Collection (Library of Congress))

References

Bibliography

1883 births
1975 deaths
People from San José, Costa Rica
Costa Rican women writers
Collectors of Indigenous art of the Americas
Costa Rican academics
Members of the Society of Woman Geographers